Liikva is a village in Harku Parish, Harju County in northern Estonia. It has a population of 517 (as of 1 December 2019).

Liikva was first mentioned in 1241 as Liqua village in the Danish Census Book.

References

Villages in Harju County